Gracie's Choice: A Story of Love is a 2004 American drama film that premiered on Lifetime. It is written by Joyce Eliason; directed by Peter Werner; and stars Ryan Britten, Kristen Bell, Anne Heche, Diane Ladd, and Kristin Fairlie.

Plot
Gracie is a 17-year-old girl whose mother is addicted to drugs. The police arrest her mother and separate the children, forcing them to leave their family dog Spike behind, but Gracie does whatever she can to keep her family together. Their mother is in and out of their lives, and her sister gets pregnant and runs off to get married, so Gracie takes on the challenge of being the caregiver and guardian to her brothers while putting herself through school and working part time.

Eventually Gracie decides that in order to keep the family stable and away from their mother's errant ways, she must petition to adopt her brothers in court. She does so but not without a fight from her mother. Ultimately the judge asks each individual boy who they want to live with, and all three say Gracie despite their mother's pleas. Seeing the stability the boys have found with their sister and taking into account the answers she was given, the judge terminates parental rights of their mother and grants them to Gracie. The trial ends with them adopting the surname of "Weatherly" from all the trials they have weathered, and the story ends with details about how well the new family is doing.

Cast
 Kristen Bell as Gracie Thompson
 Anne Heche as Rowena Lawson
 Diane Ladd as Louela Lawson
 Shedrack Anderson III as Tommy
 Roberta Maxwell as Judge
 Kristin Fairlie as Rose Carlton
 Brian Akins as Ryan Walker
 David Gibson McLean as Jonny Blicker
 Jack Armstrong as Robbie Locascio
 Robert Seeliger as Ray
 Sandra Caldwell as Mrs. Thurston

Production notes
Inspired by actual events, the film is based on a story featured in Reader's Digest from staff writer Rena Dictor LeBlanc and is described as being "sure to touch your heart".

Reception
Gracie's Choice received generally positive reviews, with critics praising the acting, story, characters, emotional weight, and both Bell and Heche's performances. Heche was nominated for the 2004 Emmy Award for "Outstanding Supporting Actress in a Miniseries or a Movie".

References

External links
 

Lifetime (TV network) films
Canadian drama television films
2004 television films
2004 films
Films directed by Peter Werner
American drama television films
2000s English-language films
2000s American films
2000s Canadian films